Ernesto José Degenhart (born 23 February 1966) is a former Guatemalan swimmer who competed in 5 out of 29 events during the 1984 Summer Olympics.

References

1966 births
Living people
Guatemalan male freestyle swimmers
Olympic swimmers of Guatemala
Swimmers at the 1984 Summer Olympics